was a Japanese and American sculptor. He was known for his wooden replicas of everyday objects such as plants and machines.

Life and work
Fumio Yoshimura studied painting at Tokyo University of the Arts, graduating in 1949. He came to Manhattan in the early 1960s. He was married to Kate Millett, who dedicated her book Sexual Politics to him. In 1985, the couple divorced.

In New York he taught himself to work wood with various knives, chisels and drills and developed a virtuoso technique. He started with forms of plants and vegetables. He used white unpainted basswood, which gave a ghostly pallor to his sculptures of everyday objects such as typewriters, sewing machines, bicycles, or a hot-dog stand. His style is often associated with hyperrealism, but he has described his works as embodying the "ghost" of objects. Objects used for human activity were often the subject of his art, but he never depicted humans. "Three Bicycles" was the central work in an exhibition at the Museum of Arts and Design (MAD) in New York City in 1986.

In 1981 Yoshimura was artist in residence at the Hood Museum of Art at Dartmouth College, where he then taught sculpture as an adjunct professor until 1993. Works by Fumio Yoshimura are in the collections of the Philadelphia Museum of Art, the Pennsylvania Academy of the Fine Arts, and the Hood Museum.

Works

Exhibit guides

References

Citations

Works cited

Further reading

External links
 Fumio Yoshimura at Artfacts.net

1926 births
2002 deaths
20th-century American sculptors
20th-century Japanese sculptors
21st-century American sculptors
21st-century Japanese sculptors
American artists of Japanese descent
Dartmouth College faculty
Deaths from pancreatic cancer
Japanese emigrants to the United States
Tokyo University of the Arts alumni
Date of birth missing
Place of birth missing